Almamegretta are a SKA /rap/dub/world/reggae group from Naples, Italy. Their lyrics are in Napoletano. Their music became quite successful within the European Trip hop scene, leading to collaborations with Massive Attack and Adrian Sherwood, who also remixed their album "Sanacore".

History
The band was established by Gianni Mantice (guitar), Patrizia Di Fiore (vocals), Gemma Aiello (bass) and Gennaro T (drums) in 1987. In 1990 Di Fiore left the band and was replaced by Raiz (also spelled Rais and Raiss) and Paolo Polcari (keyboards). D.Rad (Stefano Facchielli) later joined the group as dubber. In 2003 Raiz left the band to pursue a solo career, although he briefly reunited with the band for their 2013 effort Controra. In 2004 D.RaD died after falling off his scooter while riding in the rain.

Discography
 Figli di Annibale (1992, Anagrumba/CNI/BMG)
 Animamigrante (1993, Anagrumba/CNI/BMG)
 Fattalla (1994, Anagrumba/CNI/BMG)
 Sanacore (1995, Anagrumba/CNI/BMG)
 Indubb (1996, BMG)
 Lingo (1998, BMG)
 4/4 (1999, BMG)
 Imaginaria (2001, BMG)
 Venite! Venite! (2002, BMG)
 Sciuoglie 'e Cane (2003, Sanacore) (live)
 Almamegretta presents Dubfellas (2006, Sanacore)
 Vulgus (2008, Sanacore)
 Controra (2013, Universal)
 EnneEnne Dub (2016, Sanacore)
 Senghe (2022, Saifam Music)

References

Italian reggae musical groups
Dub musical groups
Musical groups established in 1987
Musical groups from Campania
Musicians from Naples
1987 establishments in Italy